For the 1981–82 season, Carlisle United F.C. competed in Football League Division Three.

Results & fixtures

Football League Third Division

Football League Cup

FA Cup

Football League Group Cup

References

 11v11

Carlisle United F.C. seasons